The 2004–05 George Mason Patriots men's basketball team began their 39th season of collegiate play on November 11, 2004, versus Indiana University-Purdue University Fort Wayne at the Coaches vs. Cancer Classic tournament in Memphis, TN.  The Patriots won that game, and finished the season with a record of 16 wins and 13 losses.

Season notes

 On June 3, 2005, the team hired James Johnson and promoted Chris Caputo to assistant coaches.
 The 2004–05 George Mason Patriots were predicted to finish 3rd in the Colonial Athletic Association.

Awards

Second Team All-CAA
 Lamar Butler
 Jai Lewis

Third Team All-CAA
 Tony Skinn

CAA All-Rookie Team
 Folarin Campbell
 Will Thomas
 John Vaughan

CAA Player of the Week
 Lamar Butler – Jan. 3
 Tony Skinn – Feb. 3

CAA Rookie of the Week
 Folarin Campbell – Dec. 29
 Will Thomas – Jan. 18
 Folarin Campbell – Feb. 3
 John Vaughan – Feb. 15

2004–2005 roster

Player stats

Schedule and results

|-
!colspan=9 style=|Regular season

|-
!colspan=9 style=| CAA tournament

References

George Mason
George Mason Patriots men's basketball seasons
George Mason Patriots men's basketball team
George Mason Patriots men's basketball team